Senator Spear may refer to:

Albert Spear (1852–1929), Maine State Senate
Allan Spear (1937–2008), Minnesota State Senate

See also
Jae Spears (1923–2013), West Virginia State Senate
Thomas J. Speer (1837–1872), Georgia State Senate
Jerrold Speers (born 1941), Maine State Senate
Jackie Speier (born 1950), California State Senate
Alexander Speirs (Maine politician) (1859–1927), Maine State Senate